Henrietta Kosoko was a Nollywood actress. She came into the limelight in 1995 after starring in mainstream Nollywood movies like Onome and Omolade. She was married to the veteran actor Jide Kosoko. She was buried on 10 June 2016.

References

2016 deaths
Nigerian film actresses
20th-century Nigerian actresses
21st-century Nigerian actresses
Yoruba actresses
Actresses in Yoruba cinema